Havir (also Romanized as Havīr, Hovīr, and Howvīr) is a village in Abarshiveh Rural District, in the Central District of Damavand County, Tehran Province, Iran. At the 2006 census, its population was 190, in 61 families.

References 

Populated places in Damavand County